Döschwitz is a village and a former municipality in the Burgenlandkreis district, in Saxony-Anhalt, Germany. Since 1 January 2010, it is part of the municipality Kretzschau. It is situated at Federal Road B 180 between Zeitz and Naumburg. The road is there part of the Romanic Road (German: Straße der Romanik), the most important scenic and cultural holiday road in the German state of Saxony-Anhalt.

The municipality consists of four villages:
 Döschwitz
 Gladitz
 Hollsteitz
 Kirchsteitz

Döschwitz is regionally well known for its sports club "Grün-Weiß Döschwitz". The club has five soccer teams: two for women, two for men and one for seniors. Further two teams play skittles.

References

External links 
 Website of Hollsteitz (German)
 Website of Gladitz (German)
 Website of Grün-Weiß Döschwitz (German)

Former municipalities in Saxony-Anhalt
Burgenlandkreis